Judith Doris Forst (née Lumb)  (born November 7, 1943) is a Canadian mezzo-soprano.

Born in New Westminster, British Columbia, she received a Bachelor of Music from the University of British Columbia in 1964. She is the sister-in-law of long time Vancouver radio personality Brian (Frosty) Forst. In 1968 she won the Metropolitan Opera National Council Auditions.

Forst made her debut at the Metropolitan Opera on September 19, 1968, at the age of 24 in the small role of the Page in Rigoletto. Other Met roles include (in chronological order) Tebaldo in Verdi's Don Carlo, Stéphano in Gounod's Roméo et Juliette, Mercédès in Bizet's Carmen, Teresa in Bellini's La sonnambula, Siebel in Gounod's Faust, Kate Pinkerton in Puccini's Madama Butterfly, Lola in Mascagni's Cavalleria rusticana, Bersi in Umberto Giordano's Andrea Chénier, Estrella in Offenbach's La Périchole, Preziosilla in La forza del destino, Hänsel in Hänsel und Gretel, Flora in La traviata, Giulietta in Les contes d'Hoffman, Donna Elvira in Don Giovanni, Mère Marie in Poulenc's Dialogues of the Carmelites, Kabanicha in Janáček's Káťa Kabanová, Adelaide in Arabella, The Witch in Hänsel und Gretel, and Kostelnicka in Jenůfa.

In 1991, she was made an Officer of the Order of Canada. In 2001, she was awarded the Order of British Columbia.

References

Further reading
So, Joseph (May 2007). "Judith Forst: Evergreen". La Scena Musicale, Vol. 12, No. 8

1943 births
Living people
20th-century Canadian women opera singers
Canadian mezzo-sopranos
Members of the Order of British Columbia
Officers of the Order of Canada
Operatic mezzo-sopranos
People from New Westminster
University of British Columbia alumni
Winners of the Metropolitan Opera National Council Auditions